Paul Fedor may refer to:

 Paul Fedor (director), American music video director and visual effects designer
 Paul Fedor (Canadian football), Canadian football player